İkinci Qala (also, Qala) is a village in Baku, Azerbaijan. It hosts the Gala- State Historical Ethnographic Reserve and contains a number of buildings classified as historical and architectural monuments.

References

Populated places in Baku